Alberto Bertelli Airport  is the airport serving Arapongas, Brazil.

It is operated by the Municipality of Arapongas under the supervision of Aeroportos do Paraná (SEIL).

Airlines and destinations

No scheduled flights operate at this airport.

Access

See also

List of airports in Brazil

References

External links

Airports in Paraná (state)
Arapongas